Alfred Jonniaux (22 November 18821974) was a Belgian portrait painter who worked in London and the United States of America.

Career
He was born in Brussels, Belgium, where he studied at the Académie Royale des Beaux-Arts.  He worked in Paris and established a successful career as a portraitist in London, with a studio in Yeoman's Row, Chelsea. He painted the portraits of society figures, and members of the European aristocracy and royal families. Portraits of the Mander family are in the collection at Owlpen Manor, Gloucestershire.

Following the Nazi occupation of Belgium during World War II, he fled to The United States of America, and became an American citizen in 1946. During his first ten years in America, he established studios in San Francisco and Washington, D.C. His exhibitions led to many portrait commissions from leading figures in all spheres of American life. Among the prominent figures he painted were Justice Owens J. Roberts, Kenneth Royall and Franklin D. Roosevelt, whose portrait was hung until recent years in the Roosevelt Room in the White House.

His papers are held at the Smithsonian Institution.

References 

1882 births
1974 deaths
20th-century American painters
American male painters
Belgian painters
Belgian emigrants to the United States
Artists from Brussels
American portrait painters
20th-century American male artists
Belgian expatriates in France
Belgian expatriates in the United Kingdom